"On A Slow Boat to China" is a popular song by Frank Loesser, published in 1948.

The song is a well-known pop standard, recorded by many artists, including a duet between Rosemary Clooney and Bing Crosby (for their album Fancy Meeting You Here (1958)),  Ella Fitzgerald, Joni James, Frank Sinatra, Dean Martin, Jimmy Buffett, Fats Domino and Liza Minnelli.

In the UK, the biggest hit version was recorded in 1959 by  Emile Ford and the Checkmates peaking at #3 in the official singles chart.

Ronnie Dove recorded the song for his 1966 album Ronnie Dove Sings the Hits for You.

Bette Midler and Barry Manilow recorded the song for Midler's album Bette Midler Sings the Rosemary Clooney Songbook (2003).

Miss Piggy performed the song with actor Roger Moore in an episode of The Muppet Show.

Paul McCartney sang this song to honor Frank Loesser.

Hit recordings

Idiom

Frank Loesser's daughter, Susan Loesser, authored a biography of her father, A Most Remarkable Fella (1993), in which she writes:

The idea is that a slow boat to China was the longest trip one could imagine. Loesser moved the phrase to a more romantic setting, yet it eventually entered general parlance to mean anything that takes an extremely long time.

Media

In film and television 
 Featured prominently in  Women
 Featured prominently in Woody Allen's movie September, performed by Bernie Leighton
 Featured in A Rather English Marriage
 Featured in  The Master
 Featured briefly in the Adventure Time episode "Bad Timing", sung by Tree Trunks.
 Briefly sung by "Mother" (played by June Whitfield) in an episode of the long running BBC sitcom Absolutely Fabulous called "Fish Farm."
 Appears in Eat a Bowl of Tea, a 1989 film by Wayne Wang.
 Appears at the end of the Only Fools and Horses 1988 special, Dates, sung by Tessa Peake-Jones. Also played on the piano by Albert Trotter in the episode Stage Fright.

The phrase "a slow boat to China" (or a snowclone thereof) features 
 The title of Gavin Young's break-through book, recounting a journey from Piraeus to Canton.
 The title of a novel by Chen Danyan in Shanghai, China.
 The title of a short story by Haruki Murakami, translated into English in the collection The Elephant Vanishes.
 Played on in the title of the song "Slow Hole to China" on the 2003 compilation album Slow Hole to China: Rare and Unreleased by the band Clutch.
 Played on in the title of the song "Slowcar to China" on the Gary Numan album Dance.
 Referred to elsewhere in Only Fools and Horses; an episode is called "Slow Bus to Chingford".
 Description of "girls [...] Stepping on that slow boat to China" in the Sailor song "Girls Girls Girls"
 Used as a pun in a lyric for the Where in the World is Carmen Sandiego? theme song by Rockapella.

References

Songs written by Frank Loesser
1948 songs
Benny Goodman songs
Bette Midler songs
Pop standards